María Teresa Villagrasa Pérez (born 1 November 1957) is a Spanish schoolteacher and politician. She is currently a member of the Congress of Deputies for the Spanish Socialist Workers' Party (PSOE).

Villagrasa qualified as a primary school teacher and taught at a public primary school in her native Monzón (in the province of Huesca in Aragón, northern Spain), specializing in therapeutic pedagogy, hearing and language. She served on the Monzón municipal council from 1984–99.

She was elected to the Congress of Deputies in the 2004 election for Huesca. In the 2008 election, she was number three on the PSOE list for Huesca, and was not elected. However, she returned to parliament only a few weeks later when Víctor Morlán, who had been head of the PSOE list in Huesca, resigned his seat to concentrate on his role as Secretary of State for Planning and Institutional Relations.

References

1957 births
Living people
People from Huesca
Members of the 8th Congress of Deputies (Spain)
Members of the 9th Congress of Deputies (Spain)
Spanish Socialist Workers' Party politicians